The spot-flanked gallinule (Porphyriops melanops) is a species of bird in the family Rallidae.  It is monotypic in the genus Porphyriops.  It is found in Argentina, Bolivia, Brazil, Chile, Colombia, Paraguay, Peru, and Uruguay.
Its natural habitats are swamps and freshwater lakes.

The spot-flanked gallinule has a W chromosome that is larger than its Z chromosome, which is unique among bird species.

Gallery

References

spot-flanked gallinule
Birds of South America
spot-flanked gallinule
spot-flanked gallinule
Taxa named by Louis Jean Pierre Vieillot
Taxonomy articles created by Polbot